Leucosigma is a genus of moths of the family Noctuidae. The genus was erected by Herbert Druce in 1908.

Species
Leucosigma albimixta (Schaus, 1911) Costa Rica
Leucosigma chloe (Schaus, 1914) French Guiana, Costa Rica
Leucosigma poolei Goldstein, 2018 Costa Rica
Leucosigma reletiva Dyar, 1914 Panama, Costa Rica
Leucosigma schausi Goldstein, 2018 Costa Rica, Guatemala, Panama, Mexico, Cuba
Leucosigma separata Zerny, 1916
Leucosigma solisae Goldstein, 2018 Costa Rica, Peru
Leucosigma uncifera H. Druce, 1908 Peru, Costa Rica
Leucosigma viridipicta (Dognin, 1910) French Guiana, Peru

References

Hadeninae